John Yeates (born 30 August 1938) is a former Australian rules footballer who played with Geelong in the Victorian Football League (VFL).

Family
His son Mark played at Geelong in the 1980s and became famous for his part in the 1989 VFL Grand Final.

Football
Geelong's captain in 1961 and 1962, Yeates was a member of their premiership side in 1963 and kicked two goals in the grand final.

On 6 July 1963 he was a member of the Geelong team that were comprehensively and unexpectedly beaten by Fitzroy, 9.13 (67) to 3.13 (31) in the 1963 Miracle Match.

He later played and coached West Gambier Football Club in the Western Border Football League.

See also
 1963 Miracle Match

References

External links

Australian rules footballers from South Australia
Geelong Football Club players
Geelong Football Club Premiership players
Geelong Football Club captains
1938 births
Living people
One-time VFL/AFL Premiership players